Alipurduar – Secunderabad Express is an Indian Railways express train belonging to Northeast Frontier Railway, connecting  in West Bengal and  in Hyderabad, Telangana. It currently operates on a once-weekly basis, with train numbers 05479 and 05480.
The train passes through West Bengal, Bihar, Jharkhand, Odisha, Andhra Pradesh, and Telangana.
The train starts from Alipurduar Junction at 22:30 on Friday and reaches  at 16:15 on Sunday.
During its journey the train travels through cities including Alipurduar, Siliguri, Malda, Kolkata, Kharagpur, Cuttack, Bhubaneswar, Vizianagaram,  Visakhapatnam, Rajahmundry, Vijayawada, Guntur and Hyderabad.

Route
 WEST BENGAL
 Alipurduar Junction
 Hasimara
 Binnaguri Junction
 New Mal Junction
 New Jalpaiguri (Siliguri)
 
 
 
 

 BIHAR
 

 ODISHA
 
 
 
 
 
 

ANDHRA PRADESH
 
 
 
 
 
 
 

TELANGANA
 

NOTE: The train also passes through Pakur district and Sahibganj district of Jharkhand,  but doesn't stop there.

Reversal

Locomotive
The train is hauled by WDP4 locomotive of Diesel Loco Shed, Siliguri from Alipurduar Junction to New Jalpaiguri. 
From New Jalpaiguri the train is hauled by WAP5 Electric locomotive of Electric Loco Shed, Howrah upto Visakhapatnam Junction. From there onwards it is hailed by WAP5  locomotive of Electric Loco Shed, Visakhapatnam.

References

Transport in Alipurduar
Transport in Telangana
Named passenger trains of India
Rail transport in West Bengal
Express trains in India
Alipurduar railway division